The 1947 Orange Bowl was a postseason football game featuring the Tennessee Volunteers and the Rice Owls.  It was won by Rice on the strength of a first-quarter touchdown and a safety on a bad snap during a Tennessee quick kick.  Rice outgained Tennessee 246–145 and both teams combined for 9 turnovers.

The pageantry surrounding the game consisted of a halftime show in which over 10,000 balloons were released and an appearance by Generals Dwight D. Eisenhower and Howard McCrum Snyder.  Eisenhower's group also consisted of his former Aide-de-camp Charles Craig Cannon and Coral Gables Mayor Tom Mayes.  Eisenhower claimed publicly to be taking no sides, but was close friends with Tennessee coach General Robert R. Neyland.

References

Orange Bowl
Orange Bowl
Rice Owls football bowl games
Tennessee Volunteers football bowl games
January 1947 sports events in the United States
Orange Bowl